Malcolm Mackay (born 1 September 1981, Stornoway on the Isle of Lewis, Scotland) is a Scottish crime writer. In 2013 he won the Deanston Scottish Crime Book of the Year for his novel How a Gunman Says Goodbye.

Publications

Novels
The Glasgow Trilogy 
The Necessary Death of Lewis Winter (2013)
How A Gunman Says Goodbye (2013)
The Sudden Arrival of Violence (2014)

Darian Ross Novels
In the Cage Where Your Saviours Hide (2018)
A Line of Forgotten Blood (2019)

Stand Alone Novels
The Night the Rich Men Burned (2014)
Every Night I Dream of Hell (2015)
For Those Who Know the Ending (2016)

Short Stories
Anatomy of a Hit (2013)

References

External links
 Malcolm Mackay at Rogers, Coleridge & White Literary Agency.
 Malcolm Mackay at Pan Macmillan.

1981 births
Living people
Scottish crime fiction writers
21st-century Scottish writers